PETS or Pets may refer to:

Arts and entertainment

Film and television
 Pets (film), a 1974 film
 Pets (2002 film), directed by David Lister
 "Pets", an episode of the television series Zoboomafoo

Music
 The Pets (1950s band)
 The Pets (2000s band)
 "Pets" (song), by Porno For Pyros

Video games
 The Sims 2: Pets, the fourth expansion pack of The Sims 2
 The Sims 3: Pets, the fifth expansion pack for The Sims 3

Law and government
 Pet Travel Scheme (PETS), allowing animals to be moved between countries without quarantine, using a pet passport 
 Pets Evacuation and Transportation Standards Act

Other uses
 Pets.com, a defunct dot-com enterprise that sold pet supplies
 Positron emission tomography scan, a medical imaging technique 
 Public English Test System, a language test used in Mainland China
 Public expenditure tracking system

See also
 PET (disambiguation)